Geoffrey William Marcy (born September 29, 1954) is an American astronomer. He was an early influence in the field of exoplanet detection, discovery, and characterization. Marcy was a professor of astronomy at the University of California, Berkeley, and an adjunct professor of physics and astronomy at San Francisco State University. Marcy and his research teams discovered many extrasolar planets, including 70 out of the first 100 known exoplanets and also the first planetary system around a Sun-like star, Upsilon Andromedae.  Marcy was a co-investigator on the NASA Kepler mission. His collaborators have included R. Paul Butler, Debra Fischer and Steven S. Vogt, Jason Wright, Andrew Howard, Katie Peek, John Johnson, Erik Petigura, Lauren Weiss, Lea Hirsch and the Kepler Science Team.

Early life and education
Marcy graduated from Granada Hills High School in Granada Hills, California, in 1972. He graduated with a Bachelor of Arts summa cum laude with a double major in physics and astronomy from the University of California, Los Angeles, in 1976. He then completed a doctorate in astronomy in 1982 at the University of California, Santa Cruz, with much of his work done at Lick Observatory.

Academic career
Marcy has held teaching and research positions, first at the Carnegie Institution of Washington (then the Mt. Wilson and Las Campanas Observatories) as a Carnegie fellow from 1982 to 1984. He then worked as an associate professor of physics and astronomy from 1984 to 1996 and then as a distinguished university professor from 1997 to 1999 at the San Francisco State University.

Marcy was a professor of astronomy and the Watson and Marilyn Alberts Chair for SETI at the University of California, Berkeley, from 1999 through 2015. From 2000 to 2012, he was the director of UC Berkeley's Center for Integrative Planetary Science.   Marcy was also one of the project leaders of the Breakthrough Initiatives that will search for intelligent life in the universe, using large radio and optical telescopes.

Marcy and his team confirmed Michel Mayor and Didier Queloz's discovery of the first extrasolar planet orbiting a Sun-like star—51 Pegasi b. Two months later, Marcy and his team announced the discovery of two additional planets around 47 Ursae Majoris and 70 Virginis. Other achievements include discovering the first multiple planet system around a star similar to our own (Upsilon Andromedae), the first transiting planet around another star, simultaneously with David Charbonneau and Timothy Brown (HD209458b), the first extrasolar planet orbiting beyond five AU (55 Cancri d), and the first Neptune-sized planets (Gliese 436b and 55 Cancri e). Marcy was a co-investigator of the NASA Kepler mission that discovered over 4000 exoplanets, most being smaller than four times the size of Earth.  His team, led by Erik Petigura and Andrew Howard, showed that approximately 20% of Sun-like stars have a planet of one to two times the size of Earth and receive incident stellar light within a factor of four of the light the Earth receives from the Sun, making them warm planets, many of which accommodate liquid water.

Sexual harassment and resignation
In 2015, an investigation by the University of California, Berkeley, Title IX office found that Geoffrey Marcy had violated the university's sexual harassment policy between 2001 and 2010. Four complaints were filed with the university's Title IX office, one of which Marcy denied. At least three additional allegations were made against Marcy as early as 1995 while he was at San Francisco State University, as corroborated by Penny Nixon, then SFSU's sexual harassment officer.

On October 7, 2015, Geoff Marcy posted an "Open Letter to the Astronomy Community" stating "While I do not agree with each complaint that was made, it is clear that my behavior was unwelcomed by some women. I take full responsibility and hold myself completely accountable for my actions and the impact they had. For that and to the women affected, I sincerely apologize."

On October 12, 2015, the UC Berkeley Astronomy Department met and released a statement asserting that Marcy was "inadequately disciplined" by the university, and "we believe that Geoff Marcy cannot perform the functions of a faculty member." Berkeley had recently been found on a list produced by the United States Department of Education's Office for Civil Rights, revealing that they were under review for potentially mishandling previous sexual violence cases. In a follow-up statement, the university claimed they had "imposed real consequences on Professor Geoff Marcy by establishing a zero tolerance policy regarding future behavior and by stripping him of the procedural protections that all other faculty members enjoy".

On the same day, Marcy resigned as principal investigator of the Breakthrough Listen project. Two days later, on October 14, 2015, he indicated his intention to step down from his professorship at UC Berkeley. Marcy retained the title of emeritus despite his resignation.

Later career
In May 2017, Marcy co-authored studies related to laser light emissions from stars, as a way of detecting technology-related signals from an alien civilization. The study included Tabby's Star (KIC 8462852), an oddly dimming star whose unusual light fluctuations may be the result of interference by an artificial megastructure, such as a Dyson swarm, made by such a civilization. No evidence was found for technology-related signals from Tabby's Star in the studies.

In 2021 Marcy's membership in the National Academy of Sciences was rescinded.

Personal
Marcy lives with his wife, Susan Kegley, in California.

In the media
Earlier, and as a pioneer in the study of extrasolar planets, Marcy has been featured prominently in the media, including Time magazine, The New York Times, Astronomy magazine and as a participant in various PBS Nova episodes: "Hunt for Alien Worlds" (1997), "Finding Life Beyond Earth" (2012), "Alien Planets Revealed" (2014); a BBC Horizon episode: "The Planet Hunters" (1996) and History Channel programs: The Universe (2007). Marcy was also featured on ABC News Nightline (October 20, 1995), The MacNeil-Lehrer News Hour (January 18, 1996), The David Letterman Show (April 12, 2001), a Planetary Radio interview (2007) and a National Academy of Sciences interview (2014).

Honors

 ABC News: "Person of the Week"' (January 26, 1996)
 California Scientist of the Year (2000)
 Henry Draper Medal of the National Academy of Sciences with R. Paul Butler (2001)
 Elected member of the National Academy of Sciences (2002) 
 Beatrice M. Tinsley Prize from the American Astronomical Society (2002)
 NASA Medal for Exceptional Scientific Achievement (2003)
 Discover magazine: Space Scientist of the Year (2003)
 Shaw Prize with Michel Mayor (2005)
On October 28, 2006, he received an honorary doctorate in science from the University of Delaware.
 Carl Sagan Prize for Science Popularization from Wonderfest (2009)
 Fellow of the American Academy of Arts and Sciences (2010)
 PNAS Cozzarelli Prize recipient, with Erik Petigura and Andrew Howard (2013)
On June 9, 2012, he received an honorary doctorate in science from the University of Chicago.
 Named the 2015 Miller Senior Fellow of the Miller Institute at the University of California Berkeley.

See also
 List of stars with confirmed planets

References

External links
 Marcy's personal homepage
 Autobiography
 
 Interview with Geoff Marcy (March 11, 2009) 
 Interview with Geoff Marcy (February 1, 2011)

Discoverers of exoplanets
Fellows of the American Academy of Arts and Sciences
Living people
Members of the United States National Academy of Sciences
1954 births
People from St. Clair Shores, Michigan
San Francisco State University faculty
21st-century American  astronomers
20th-century American astronomers
University of California, Berkeley faculty
University of California, Los Angeles alumni
University of California, Santa Cruz alumni
Winners of the Beatrice M. Tinsley Prize
Planetary scientists
Granada Hills Charter High School alumni